The A626 is a trunk road which runs through Stockport to the High Peak.

References

External links
A626 - Roader's Digest: The SABRE Wiki

Roads in England
Roads in Derbyshire
Roads in Greater Manchester